Notable events of 2020 in webcomics.

Events

Awards
 Eisner Awards, "Best Webcomic" won by Erica Eng's Fried Rice
 Harvey Awards, "Digital Book of the Year" won by Matt Bors' The Nib
 Ignatz Awards, "Outstanding Online Comic" won by Ariel Ries' Witchy
 Ministry of Culture, Sports and Tourism, "Today's Our Manhwa Award" won by Oh Seong-dae's 
 Next Manga Award, "Web Manga" won by Norio Sakurai's The Dangers in My Heart

Webcomics started

 January 12 — I Cross-Dressed for the IRL Meetup by Kurano
 February 14 — Lost in Translation by Jjolee
 February 23 — Kiruru Kill Me by Yasuhiro Kanō
 February 28 – Mr. Boop by Alec Robbins
 April 3 – Uchi no Kaisha no Chiisai Senpai no Hanashi by Saisō
 May 16 — Excuse Me Dentist, It's Touching Me! by Sho Yamazaki
 October 3 — Josou o Yamerarenaku Naru Otokonoko no Hanashi by Kobashiko

Webcomics ended
 Kimi ga Shinu Made Ato Hyaku Nichi by Migihara, 2018–2020
 Otokonoko Zuma by Crystal na Yousuke, 2016–2020
 The Sound of Heart by Jo Seok, 2006–2020
 Yumi's Cells by Lee Dong-geun 2015–2020
 Sweet Home by Kim Carnby and Hwang Young-chan, 2017–2020
 Siren's Lament by instantmiso, 2016–2020
 My Dear Cold-Blooded King by lifelight, 2017–2020
 Ghost Teller by QTT and Studio LICO, 2017–2020
 Apocalyptic Horseplay by Boredman, 2016–2020
 Sword Interval by Benjamin Fleuter, 2015–2020
 Schlock Mercenary by Howard Tayler, 2000–2020

References

 
Webcomics by year